Biltnerites is a genus of ammonites (s.l.) from the lower Triassic included in the ceratitacean family Tirolitidae of the order Ceratitida, characterized by a flat, evolute shell with moderately compressed, rounded whorls. The spinose stage characteristic of the Tirolitidae is absent, but the outer whorl does have indistinct ribs that cross the venter.

Biltnerites has been found in Lower Triassic sediments is S.E. Europe

References 

 Treatise on Invertebrate Paleontology, Part L; Ch. Mesozoic Ammonoidea. Geological Soc of America and U Kansas Press, R.C Moore (ed)

Ceratitoidea
Ceratitida genera
Triassic ammonites
Ammonites of Europe